Saturday Party was an Australian television variety series which aired on Melbourne station ABV-2 in 1959, running from February to August. The series aired in a 45-minute time slot.

Program synopsis
Hosted by Bob Cornish and often a co-host such as Jocelyn Terry or Corinne Kerby, regulars included the Mamie Reid Ensemble. People who made guest appearances during the run of the series included pianist John Doyle, singer Pat Grierson, singer Ken Brown, singer Judy Banks, singer Frankie Davidson, singer Heather Horwood, the Victorian Trumpet Trio, comedian Lloyd Cunnington, accordion player Alan Paul, soprano Joy Mammen, comedy duo Wilson and Carr (who made several appearances), accordion player Lorraine Bransgrove, singer Joy Grisold, singer Graeme Bent, baritone Bill Tichner, singer Lee de Coney, dancers Max Bond and Norma Connolly, magician Rids can der Zee, singer Eunice McGowan, singer Max Blake, Don Snibert, acrobatic team Duo Sylvanos, singer Joan Clarke, singer Irene Hewitt, magician Caffarl, and rope spinner Tex Granville.

An episode of this series may be held by the National Archives of Australia (per a search of their website).

References

External links
Saturday Party at IMDb

1959 Australian television series debuts
1959 Australian television series endings
Australian variety television shows
Australian Broadcasting Corporation original programming
Black-and-white Australian television shows
English-language television shows
Australian live television series